This is a list of flag bearers who have represented Liberia at the Olympics.

Flag bearers carry the national flag of their country at the opening ceremony of the Olympic Games.

See also
Liberia at the Olympics

References

Liberia at the Olympics
Liberia
Olympic flagbearers